Kabirwala, is an administrative subdivision, tehsil, of Khanewal District in the Punjab province of Pakistan.

Administration
It is administratively subdivided into 34 Union Councils, two of which form the tehsil capital Kabirwala.

The tehsil of Kabirwala is administratively subdivided into 34 Union Councils, these are:

Notable people 
 Syed Hussain Jahania Gardezi is a Pakistani politician, who is currently serving as 'Provincial Minister of Punjab for Management and Professional Development.

References
 

Khanewal District
Tehsils of Punjab, Pakistan